Nicholas Jeremy Thomas   (born 1960) is an Australian-born anthropologist, Professor of Historical Anthropology, and Director, Museum of Archaeology and Anthropology, University of Cambridge since 2006, and Fellow of Trinity College, Cambridge since 2007.

Career
Thomas was born in Australia in 1960.

In 1984 he travelled to the Pacific Islands to research his PhD thesis on the Marquesas Islands. He has worked in Fiji and New Zealand, various archives and museums in Europe, North America, and in the Pacific region.

He was elected as a Corresponding Fellow of the Australian Academy of the Humanities in 1997, and around that time was also the inaugural Director of the Centre for Cross-Cultural Research (CCR) at the Australian National University.

Thomas was elected to the British Academy in 2005, and became a Fellow of Trinity College, Cambridge, in 2007.

He participated in a workshop at the British Museum from November 2016 to examine the provenance of the Gweagal Shield, the shield originating from the Aboriginal Australian Gweagal people of the Botany Bay area, believed to have been taken in April 1770 by Captain Cook's expedition. The workshop concluded that it was not that specific shield, and Thomas' paper on it was published whose paper was included in Australian Historical Studies along with another report from the workshop.

Current positions
 he is Professor of Historical Anthropology and Director at the Museum of Archaeology and Anthropology at the University of Cambridge, a member of the Conseil d’orientation scientifique of the Musée du Quai Branly in Paris as well as the International Advisory Board of the Humboldt Forum in Berlin.

Awards and honours
He was awarded the 2010 Wolfson History Prize for his book Islanders: The Pacific in the Age of Empire.

Selected publications 
 Islanders: The Pacific in the Age of Empire (2012) 
  Rauru: Tene Waitere, Maori Carving, Colonial History (2008), with Mark Adams
 Hiapo: Past and present in Niuean barkcloth (2005), with John Pule, 
 Discoveries: the Voyages of Captain James Cook (2003)
Possessions: Indigenous Art/Colonial Culture (1999)
 Oceanic Art (World of Art) (1995),  
 Entangled Objects (1991)

References

 

1960 births
Living people
British archaeologists
Fellows of the British Academy
Fellows of Trinity College, Cambridge
British anthropologists
Australian anthropologists